
Częstochowa County is a unit of territorial administration and local government (powiat) in Silesian Voivodeship, southern Poland. It came into being on January 1, 1999, as a result of the Polish local government reforms passed in 1998. Its administrative seat is the city of Częstochowa, although the city is not part of the county (it constitutes a separate city county).

As of 2019 its total population is 134,637, out of which the population of Blachownia is 9,545, that of Koniecpol is 5,910, and the rural population is 119,182.

Neighbouring counties
Apart from the city of Częstochowa, Częstochowa County is also bordered by Pajęczno County to the north, Radomsko County to the north-east, Włoszczowa County to the east, Zawiercie County and Myszków County to the south, Lubliniec County to the west, and Kłobuck County to the north-west.

Administrative division
The county is subdivided into 16 gminas (two urban-rural and 14 rural). These are listed in the following table, in descending order of population.

Administration

Starost (Governor)
Krzysztof Smela (PSL) - since 9 February 2017

Częstochowa County Council

Majority (coalition): PSL (green) - 9, KO (orange) - 1, local committees (black) - 7

Opposition: PiS (blue) - 8

References

County Election results

 
Land counties of Silesian Voivodeship